Saint-Saire is a commune in the Seine-Maritime department in the Normandy region in north-western France.

Geography

Population

Places of interest
 The church of St. Saire, dating from the thirteenth century.

People
 Henri de Boulainvilliers, French write and historian, was born here.

See also
Communes of the Seine-Maritime department

References

Communes of Seine-Maritime